Shaike may refer to:

People
Shaike Levi (born 1939), Israeli comedian, singer, and actor
Shaike Ophir (1929–87), Israeli film actor and comedian